Solly Kaye (8 October 1913 – 1 May 2005) was a British communist politician.

Born in the St Pancras area of London to Jewish parents from Lithuania, Kaye's father died in the Spanish Flu epidemic when he was only five years old, and his mother brought up four children with support from Jewish charities.  He left school at fourteen to work as a woodcarver, but lost his job as business was slow.  He managed instead to find work for a furrier, although working conditions were very poor.  He took art lessons at the Bethnal Green Men's Institute, and was exhibited in Foyle's Gallery.

In 1934, Kaye joined the Communist Party of Great Britain (CPGB), initially through the National Unemployed Workers' Movement; he was present at the Battle of Cable Street, and gave speeches opposing the British Union of Fascists.

Kaye was soon appointed as CPGB branch secretary for Hackney and, as a result, he decided not to volunteer for the International Brigades in the Spanish Civil War.  He married Margaret Johnson in 1945 having walked her home for five successive nights and proposing to her on a park bench on the fifth. They had three children - Jan, Johnny and Johanna.

Kaye became involved in protests against slum landlords.  Although initially he experienced hostility from the church, he gradually won them over; the Franciscan Neville Palmer declared that "it is not a sin to vote for Solly Kaye" and John Groser claimed that "Solly Kaye is the one remaining prophet of the Lord amid all the prophets of Baal on Stepney Council".  In 1963, Kaye disguised himself to attend the auction of Eileen Mansions, a tenement in Whitechapel.  Once inside, he threatened that anyone who bought the property would experience trouble from him and the tenants, and the property did not sell.  This won over anti-communist priest Joe Williamson, who thereafter recommended that his parishioners should vote for Kaye.

Kaye stood for election in Stepney at the 1955 general election and again in 1959, 1964, 1966 and 1970, taking six to eight percent of the vote on each occasion.  However, he was elected to Stepney Borough Council, holding his seat for fifteen years; in later years, on its replacement, the London Borough of Tower Hamlets.  He also stood unsuccessfully for London County Council, and for the Greater London Council in 1964 and 1967, taking the party's best vote share in the city on each occasion, peaking at 10.7% on the second occasion.

Alongside his council post, Kaye gave regular speeches in Finsbury Square, and worked as a copywriter, then later as a woodwork teacher at Acland Burghley School.  From the mid-1970s, he came to believe that reform of the CPGB was needed, although he opposed its ultimately dissolution, in 1991.  He spoke about the anti-fascist movement of the 1930s at events in the late 1980s, to counter the rise of the British National Party. He died in 2005.

References

1913 births
2005 deaths
Communist Party of Great Britain councillors
Councillors in the London Borough of Tower Hamlets
English people of Lithuanian-Jewish descent
Jewish British politicians
Jewish socialists